Hapoel Ashdod, is a handball club from the city of Ashdod, Israel. They compete in the Israeli Handball League, within the Israeli first division.

In 1970, when the club was first formed, they played in the second division; for an intermediate period, they played in the third division, but returned to their earlier position in 2008. At the end of 2010/11 season, for the first time in its history, the team reached the first division. In April 2011, the team reached the National Cup quarter-final.

The team's colors are red and white, and it hosts its home games in HaKiriya Arena in Ashdod.

European record

Team Roster 2011/12
  Omar Abulafia
  Menny Algarisi
  Aviad Dahan
  Roy Kashkash
  Nathaniel Melloul
  Eliasi Sobtzitz
  Pinchas Botraswili (gc)
  Glory Ofor
  Andrei Sflttz'nko (gc)
  Tomislav Brož

External links
 Team Profile in the Israeli Handball Association site
 Team website  (Hebrew)

Israeli handball clubs
Handball clubs established in 1970
Sport in Ashdod
Hapoel